Isari may refer to:
Isari, Afghanistan, a village in northeastern Afghanistan
Isaris, a village in Arcadia, southern Greece